The 2020 SEC softball season began with practices in January 2020, followed by the start of the 2020 NCAA Division I softball season in February. Conference will start in March 2020 and will conclude in May, followed by the 2020 Southeastern Conference softball tournament at Rhoads Stadium in Tuscaloosa, Alabama, in May. Vanderbilt University is the only full member of the Southeastern Conference to not sponsor a softball program.

Preseason

SEC preseason poll
The SEC preseason poll was released on January 15, 2020.

Head coaches

Note: Stats shown are before the beginning of the season. Overall and SEC records are from time at current school.

Conference matrix

References

 
Southeastern Conference softball seasons